The Galapagos ridgefin eel (Callechelys galapagensis) is an eel in the family Ophichthidae (worm/snake eels). It was described by John E. McCosker and Richard Heinrich Rosenblatt in 1972. It is a tropical, marine eel which is known from four specimens collected from the Galapagos Islands (from which its species epithet and common name are derived), in the southeastern Pacific Ocean. It inhabits coral, sand and rock.

The IUCN redlist currently lists the Galapagos ridgefin eel as Data Deficient due to its being only known from the original four specimens.

References

Ophichthidae
Fish described in 1972